Wonderland is the ninth studio album by the British singer-songwriter Judie Tzuke, released in 1992.

Though released on a small independent label, it was the last of Tzuke's albums to be released before she founded her own record label, Big Moon Records, which has released all of her subsequent albums.

Track listing
All tracks composed by Judie Tzuke and Bob Noble, except where indicated
 "Wonderland" – 4:45
 "I Can Read Books" – 4:19
 "Swimming" (Judie Tzuke, Mike Paxman) – 4:14
 "Fly" – 3:28
 "She Loves His Hands" (Judie Tzuke, Mike Paxman) – 5:14
 "Sara's Gone" – 4:08
 "Vivien" – 4:19
 "On a Ship" – 4:49
 "Keep Control" – 4:56
 "Man and a Gun" – 3:14
 "In the Morning" (Bonus track on re-issue)

Personnel
Judie Tzuke – vocals, backing vocals
John Parricelli – guitars, acoustic guitar
Mike Paxman – synthesizers, bass on track 1, drums and guitar on track 6, guitar on track 10, engineer, producer
Bob Noble – synthesizers, organ, piano, percussion, string arrangements
Pete Murray – piano, electric piano, synthesizers
Brad Lang – bass guitar, coffee tin
Ian Thomas – drums, percussion
Chris Fletcher – percussion, bells, whistles
Paul Muggleton – guitar, keyboards, percussion, backing vocals, engineer, producer

Additional musicians
Andy Hamilton – saxophones on track 1 and 4, EWI woodwind on track 4
Brian May – guitars on track 2
Don Snow – backing vocals on track 2
Mary and Lucy Cooper – backing vocals on track 3
Nigel Kennedy – violin on track 8

Production
Mark Evans – engineer, mixing
Tudor Humphries – cover painting

References

Official website

Judie Tzuke albums
1992 albums
Albums produced by Mike Paxman
Castle Communications albums